The Fundamental Elements of Southtown is the third studio album and major label debut of Christian nu metal band P.O.D., released on August 24, 1999. It went on to become the band's first platinum album, peaking at No. 51 on the Billboard 200 chart in April 2000. It was the 143rd best-selling album of 2000 in the United States.
"Southtown" and "Rock the Party (Off the Hook)" became the album's singles, both of which were accompanied by music videos. The album also includes a cover of U2's "Bullet the Blue Sky".

Cover art 

The cover art displayed on The Fundamental Elements of Southtown was censored when sold in Christian bookstores. Retailers complained about the depiction of a cigar and also argued that the artwork featured "pagan" imagery.

Track listing

Awards

2000 San Diego Music Awards
 Album of the Year
 Song of the Year - "Rock the Party (Off the Hook)"

2001 GMA Dove Awards
 Short Form Music Video of the Year - "Rock the Party (Off the Hook)"

Personnel
Credits adapted from the album's liner notes.

P.O.D.
 Sonny Sandoval – vocals
 Marcos Curiel – lead guitar
 Traa Daniels – bass
 Wuv Bernardo – drums, rhythm guitar

Additional musicians
 Lisa Papineau – background vocals 
 DJ Circa – turntables
 Santos – percussion
 Howard Benson – keyboards

Production
 Robert Green Brooks – engineer, mixing
 Ernie Vigil – assistant engineer
 Marc Moncrief – assistant engineer
 Matt Silva – assistant engineer
 Howard Benson – mixing
 Chris Lord-Alge – mixing 
 Gavin Lurssen – mastering

Imagery
 Michael Robinson NYC – Art Direction + Design
 Jean Bastarache – paintings
 Chapman Baehler – band photos
 Eric Altenburger – band photo retouching
 David Allen – band logo

Charts

Weekly charts

Year-end charts

Limited edition bonus EP

The Limited edition bonus EP was released by P.O.D. as a free CD given away with the purchase of their first mainstream album, The Fundamental Elements of Southtown, in 1999. It contained a new version of the song "Draw the Line" (from the album Snuff the Punk) and the demo version of "Lie Down" (on The Fundamental Elements of Southtown). It also has the new track "It's About Time", the instrumental demo "Estrella", the intro "Warriors Come Out to Play...", and a track with "Messages for Your Answering Machine". Because of its limited release, it is now considered a collector's item.

Track listing

References

P.O.D. albums
1999 albums
Atlantic Records albums
Albums produced by Howard Benson
1999 EPs
Atlantic Records EPs